Agualva-Cacém is a Portuguese city located in the municipality of Sintra. It comprises the civil parishes of Agualva, Cacém, Mira-Sintra, and São Marcos, equivalent to 81,845 inhabitants of the municipalities population.

History
The name Agualva-Cacém belonged to a civil parish that encompassed  of the municipality of Sintra. On 12 July 2001, that parish was elevated to the status of city and divided into four civil parishes (24 July 2001).

The toponym "Agualva" is derived from the Latin Aqua alba, meaning white (pure) water, while "Cacém" is derived from the Arabic Qāsim (قاسم‎), meaning "the one who distributes".

Geography
Agualva-Cacém is divided into four civil parishes, which fall within a territorial extent within the Greater Lisbon subregion, an area of mostly residential suburbs.

With the Reorganização Administrativa do Território das Freguesias (Administrative Reorganization of the Territory of Parishes) - Law Nº. 11-A/2013, 21st of January, 2013, the four parishes were merged in two unions of parishes: União das Freguesias de Agualva e Mira-Sintra and União das Freguesias do Cacém e S. Marcos.

The train station (Estação Ferroviária de Agualva-Cacém) exists since 1887 (then under the operation of the Larmanjat railway company (1870-1877)). It was completely remodeled in 2013 (remodeling works began in 2008).

Architecture
 Anta de Agualva
 Gruta do Colaride

Notable citizens

 D. Domingos Jardo, Bishop of Lisbon (1289-1293)
 Bebé, footballer
 José Lima, footballer

Sport
There are several football clubs in Agualva-Cacém and two futsal clubs; these include:
 Atlético Clube do Cacém
 Grupo Desportivo Os Nacionais
 Grupo Desportivo do Bairro Azul
 Ginásio Clube 1° de Maio de Agualva
 Clube Unidos do Cacém
 Novos Talentos

References

External links 

 União das Freguesias do Cacém e S. Marcos
 Junta de Freguesia do Cacém
 Junta de Freguesia de S. Marcos
 União das Freguesias de Agualva e Mira-Sintra
 Junta de Freguesia da Agualva
 Junta de Freguesia de Mira-Sintra

Cities in Portugal
Populated places in Lisbon District
Places in Sintra